The Convent of the Assumption at Sidmouth, Devon, was a Catholic girls-only, private boarding school.

History

Arrival of the Sisters of the Assumption (1882-1914)

The Sisters of the Religious of the Assumption are a Catholic, female congregation founded in Paris in 1839 by Saint Anne Eugenie Milleret (in her religious life took the name Marie Eugenie of Jesus) along with Fr. Theodore Combalot. The nuns of this congregation arrived in Sidmouth in 1882 first settling at Cottington House, before relocating to their new, purpose-built convent two years later (in 1884). The convent's chapel served the local Catholic parish at this time.

A school is established (1914 - 1976)

One of the founding motivations for the congregation was the "regeneration of society through the education of girls and women"  therefore, when three Belgium girls sheltering from the devastation of the Great War were not able to return home (and were subsequently joined by other girls from Belgium), the sisters decided to begin teaching at the site. The first lessons were held on 13 September 1914. The convent's Mother Superior from 1911 to 1928, Ellen Lansdell (9 April 1861 - 18 June 1949), a nun who was also known as Mother Lelia, is credited with starting to teach at the site (along with two other sisters), effectively founding the school.

House system

There were two houses that the students gained admission to once they had achieved high academic and sporting prowess and demonstrated good conduct; these were St. Paul's (green) and St. Peter's (red).

British Council association

The convent school at Sidmouth was the first and only independent preparatory school to be members of the British Council's Education Counselling Service, which accounts for the large international presence from the school's earliest days.

Associated people

The English hymn writer Matthew Bridges (14 July 1800 - 6 October 1894), who wrote the lyrics to Crown Him with Many Crowns along with Godfrey Thring, had a home at the site and is buried there.
Mother Margaret McFarlin, nun and educator, and the person credited with steering Siegfried Sassoon towards the Catholic faith, taught at the convent. Sassoon once described her as "the greatest benefactor of my life".
The English scholar, Christopher Dawson sent both his daughters to board at the convent in Sidmouth.

St. John's International School, Devon (1976 - present)
 
The former convent's buildings now form St John's International School, a lay, independent, co-educational day and boarding school. In 2007, the school was brought under the International Education Systems (IES) umbrella.

References 

Boarding schools in Devon
Girls' schools in Devon
Defunct schools in Devon
Defunct Catholic schools in the Diocese of Plymouth
Sidmouth
Defunct boarding schools in England